The Catoctin AVA is an American Viticultural Area located in the Frederick and Washington counties of western Maryland.  The region is bordered by Catoctin Mountain to the east, the Pennsylvania border to the north, South Mountain to the west, and the Potomac River to the south.  "Catoctin" is Algonquian for "speckled rock" (c.f. Ojibwa gidagasin: "speckled rock", "flecked rock" or "spotted rock"), a geological feature of the area.  Two commercial wineries operate in the AVA. The hardiness zones are 7a and 6b.

References

American Viticultural Areas
Geography of Frederick County, Maryland
Maryland wine
Geography of Washington County, Maryland
1983 establishments in Maryland